Events in the year 1819 in Art.

Events
 November - The Museo del Prado opens to the public as the Royal Museum of Paintings and Sculptures in Madrid.
 Francisco Goya begins the series of "Black Paintings", working directly onto the walls of his dining and sitting rooms at his home, Quinta del Sordo, near Madrid.
 The Liverpool Royal Institution in England acquires 37 paintings from the collection of William Roscoe, who has to sell his collection following the failure of his banking business, nucleus of what becomes the Walker Art Gallery collection.

Works

 Washington Allston – Florimell's Flight
 John Constable – The Gathering Storm
 Marie Ellenrieder – Self-portrait as a painter
 Caspar David Friedrich – On a Sailing Ship
 Théodore Géricault – The Raft of the Medusa (Le Radeau de la Méduse)
 Anne-Louis Girodet de Roussy-Trioson – Pygmalion and Galatea
 Francisco Goya
 The Madhouse
 A Procession of Flagellants
 Jean-Baptiste Paulin Guérin – Christ on the Knees of the Virgin
 Louis Hersent – Abdication of Gustavus Vasa (destroyed in 1848)
 Jean-Auguste-Dominique Ingres – 
Gianciotto Discovers Paolo and Francesca
Niccolò Paganini
 Jérôme-Martin Langlois – Générosité d'Alexandre
 John Martin – The Fall of Babylon
 Joseph Paelinck – William I of the Netherlands
 Henry Raeburn – Francis MacNab, The MacNab
 Bertel Thorvaldsen – Christ and the Twelve Apostles
 John Trumbull – Declaration of Independence
 J. M. W. Turner – England: Richmond Hill, on the Prince Regent's Birthday

Births
January 6 – Baldassare Verazzi, Italian painter (died 1886)
January 9 – William Powell Frith, English genre painter (died 1909)
February 8 – John Ruskin, English artist and critic (died 1900)
February 16 – Sophia Isberg, Swedish woodcut artist (died 1875)
February 23 – John Webb Singer, English art founder and collector (died 1904)
March 20 – Roger Fenton, English photographer (died 1869)
June 3 – Johan Jongkind, Dutch painter (died 1891)
June 10 – Gustave Courbet, French painter (died 1877)
June 16 – Thomas Skinner, English etcher (poisoned 1881)
June 23 – Henry Peters Gray, American portrait painter (died 1877)
August 11 - Martin Johnson Heade, American painter (died 1904)
June 28 – Henri Harpignies, French landscape painter (died 1916)
September 20 – Théodore Chassériau, French painter (died 1856)
December 19 – Arthur Gilbert, English landscape painter (died 1895)
 date unknown
 Nicholas Joseph Crowley, Irish portrait painter (died 1857)
 Edwin Hayes, British marine watercolourist (died 1904)

Deaths
January 15 – Gustav Philipp Zwinger, German painter and etcher (born 1779)
February 16 – Pierre-Henri de Valenciennes, French painter (born 1750)
March 4 – Johann Nepomuk della Croce, Austrian painter (born 1736)
May 2 – Mary Moser, English painter  (born 1744)
May 10 – Mariano Salvador Maella, Spanish painter and engraver (born 1739)
May 19 – Archibald Skirving, Scottish portrait painter (born 1749)
May 21 – Dionys van Dongen, Dutch painter (born 1748)
July 10 – Pierre-Simon-Benjamin Duvivier, French engraver of coins and medals (born 1730)
July 31 – Jurriaan Andriessen, Dutch decorative painter (born 1742)
August – Paolo Borroni, Italian painter of the Neoclassical style (born 1749)
August 1 – Pierre-Adrien Pâris, French architect, painter and designer (born 1745)
August 27 – John Lewin, English-born Australian artist (born 1770)
September 15 – Johann Georg Edlinger, Austrian court painter (born 1741)
October 8 – William Beilby,  English glassworker and enameller (born 1740)
November 2 – Edward Bird, English genre painter  (born 1772)
November 5 – Alexander Kucharsky, Polish portrait painter (born 1741)
November 11 – Moses Griffith, Welsh draughtsman, engraver and water colourist (born 1749)
December 3 – Johann Conrad Felsing, German topographer and engraver using stippling (born 1766)
 date unknown
 Prosper-Gabriel Audran, French engraver, lawyer and academic (born 1744)
 Wojciech Kucharski, Polish sculptor and mason (born 1741)
 Anna Sibylla Sergell, textile artist of the royal Swedish court (born 1733)
 Gustava Johanna Stenborg, Swedish embroiderer (born 1776)

References

 
Years of the 19th century in art
1810s in art